Kollur is a village in Bapatla district in the Indian state of Andhra Pradesh. It is the headquarters of Kollur mandal in Repalle revenue division.

Geography 

Economy 
Agriculture

The major occupation of the village is agriculture and main crop cultivated is paddy.

Brick industry

The village is famous for Brick manufacturing. The soil which is available at the bank of Krishna river is very good to make bricks. Every year millions of bricks are manufactured and transported to nearby districts and far off places like Hyderabad too. There are around 400 trucks owned by the local citizens. The Brick industry was started first by Sri. Koganti Venkata Rattaiah.

Government and politics 

Gajullanka gram panchayat is the local self-government of the village. It is divided into wards and each ward is represented by a ward member. The village forms a part of Andhra Pradesh Capital Region and is under the jurisdiction of APCRDA.

Education 

As per the school information report for the academic year 2018–19, the village has a total of 19 schools. These include 13 Zilla/Mandal Parishad and 6 private schools.

See also 
List of villages in Guntur district

References 

Villages in Guntur district
Mandal headquarters in Guntur district